Tianjin Zoo is located in Nankai District, Tianjin, China, as the south-most part of the Water Park complex. Construction began in 1975 and it was opened to the public on January 1, 1980. It houses approximately 3,000 animals of 200 species.

The zoo is divided into separate habitats for:  monkeys/apes, bears, lions, pandas, songbirds, elephants, hippos/rhinos and amphibians.

References

External links 

Zoos in China
Tourist attractions in Tianjin
Buildings and structures in Tianjin
1980 establishments in China
Zoos established in 1980